Clay Township is an inactive township in Clark County, in the U.S. state of Missouri.

Clay Township was established in 1868, taking its name from Henry Clay, the Kentucky statesman.

References

Townships in Missouri
Townships in Clark County, Missouri